The Best of Ten 1996–1999 is the first compilation album released by the hard rock band Ten, which consists of tracks taken from their first four albums. The double compact disc was officially released only in Asian markets.

Track listing
All songs written by Gary Hughes except where noted.

Disc one

 "The Name of the Rose" – 8:33
 "After the Love Has Gone" – 5:26
 "We Rule the Night" – 5:28
 "Standing on the Edge of Time" – 5:01 (Hughes, Vinny Burns)
 "Red" – 4:19
 "Virtual Reality"  – 5:48
 "The Torch" – 5:23
 "Goodnight Saigon" – 7:05
 "Through the Fire" – 8:14
 "Arcadia" – 7:33
 "Stay With Me" – 5:50
 "The Loneliest Place in the World" – 10:28

Disc two

 "March of the Argonauts" (Instrumental) – 2:16
 "Fear the Force" – 5:35
 "Don't Cry – 4:58
 "Lamb to the Slaughter" – 4:48
 "Yesterday Lies in the Flames" – 5:03
 "The Robe" – 9:04
 "Bright on the Blade" – 4:49
 "The Alchemist" – 5:08
 "You're in My Heart" – 6:31
 "The Rainbow" – 6:02 (Hughes, Zoe Hughes)
 "Spellbound" – 5:14
 "Wait for You" – 5:31
 "Till the End of Time" – 4:57

Personnel
Gary Hughes – vocals
Vinny Burns – Lead guitars
John Halliwell – Rhythm guitars
Steve McKenna – bass guitar
Ged Rylands – keyboards
Greg Morgan – drums

Production
Mixing – Mike Stone
Mixing – Rafe McKenna

References

External links
Heavy Harmonies page

Ten (band) albums
1999 compilation albums
Albums produced by Gary Hughes
Mercury Records compilation albums